András Horváth (born 3 February 1988) is a Hungarian professional footballer who plays for Budafok.

References
 
 

1988 births
People from Kistarcsa
Sportspeople from Pest County
21st-century Hungarian people
Living people
Hungarian footballers
Association football goalkeepers
MTK Budapest FC players
Szigetszentmiklósi TK footballers
Vasas SC players
FC Hatvan footballers
Budapest Honvéd FC players
Budapest Honvéd FC II players
Budafoki LC footballers
Nemzeti Bajnokság I players
Nemzeti Bajnokság II players